The Division of Brand is an Australian electoral division in Perth, Western Australia. Brand was first created in 1984 and is named after Sir David Brand, Premier of Western Australia 1959-71. Brand governed Western Australia at a time when the state was developing its new mining and industrial base.

According to the 2006 census, Brand is the electorate with the lowest proportion (12.6%) of residents with a university qualification.

The current MP is Madeleine King, a member of the Australian Labor Party. She was first elected in 2016. Brand has remained a Labor stronghold since its inception, having never supported the Coalition.

Geography
Since 1984, federal electoral division boundaries in Australia have been determined at redistributions by a redistribution committee appointed by the Australian Electoral Commission. Redistributions occur for the boundaries of divisions in a particular state, and they occur every seven years, or sooner if a state's representation entitlement changes or when divisions of a state are malapportioned.

History

The seat was created for the 1984 federal election from parts of the Divisions of Fremantle and Canning to cater for substantial population growth in the Rockingham–Mandurah coastal area south of the state capital Perth. Initially it included country areas to the south and southeast, such as agricultural regions in the Shires of Murray, Waroona and Harvey and the mining town of Collie, and was significantly more marginal for Labor—made abundantly clear by Labor's near-defeat in the seat at the 1996 federal election. The redistribution for the 1998 election saw the electorate become an entirely urban seat, retreating north of the Peel Estuary to roughly its present boundaries, and the seat has been safe Labor ever since.

Brand has had four members —two of whom had previously been sitting members for other seats. Wendy Fatin had been the member for Canning for a single term prior to the creation of Brand, and went on to win in four successive elections, becoming Minister for the Arts in the early 1990s. Upon her retirement from politics, Kim Beazley, who had been Minister for Defence in the Hawke Government until 1990 and had several portfolios before becoming Deputy Prime Minister to Paul Keating in 1995, was preselected for the seat following 16 years as member for the marginal seat of Swan which polling suggested the party was certain to lose. At the 1996 election, Beazley won by just 387 votes against Liberal candidate Penny Hearne, who was later to quit the party and run as an independent against Court minister Doug Shave in the 1996 state election for the seat of Alfred Cove.  The third member was Gary Gray, from 2007 to 2016. On 25 March 2013, Gray was appointed to the Australian Cabinet as the Minister for Resources and Energy, the Minister for Tourism, and the Minister for Small Business. From 2010 until 2013, Gray served as the Special Minister of State and the Minister for the Public Service and Integrity.

The redistribution for the 2010 federal election made the seat slightly more secure for Labor by transferring some 12,000 Mandurah voters to the neighbouring Division of Canning.  A redistribution ahead of the 2016 election removed the seat's share of Mandurah altogether, increasing the Labor majority from 52 percent to 54 percent.

Gray retired in 2016, and Madeleine King retained the seat for Labor on a swing just under 8 percent.

In the 2021 redistribution, the electoral boundaries of Brand were left unchanged. Consequently, the 2016 boundaries continued to apply as of the 2022 election.

Geography
Since the 2016 election, the division has consisted of enrolled voters resident in the City of Kwinana and the City of Rockingham. Suburbs presently included are:

City of Kwinana

 Anketell
 Bertram
 Calista
 Casuarina
 Hope Valley
 Kwinana Beach
 Kwinana Town Centre
 Leda
 Mandogalup
 Medina
 Naval Base
 Orelia
 Parmelia
 Postans
 The Spectacles
 Wandi
 Wellard

City of Rockingham

 Baldivis
 Cooloongup
 East Rockingham
 Garden Island
 Golden Bay
 Hillman
 Karnup
 Keralup (part)
 Peron
 Port Kennedy
 Rockingham
 Safety Bay
 Secret Harbour
 Shoalwater
 Singleton
 Waikiki
 Warnbro

Members

Election results

References

External links
 Division of Brand - Australian Electoral Commission

Electoral divisions of Australia
Constituencies established in 1984
1984 establishments in Australia
Federal politics in Western Australia